Oleksandr Oleksandrovych Drambayev (born 21 April 2001) is a Ukrainian professional footballer who plays as a defender for Belgian club Zulte Waregem, on loan from Shakhtar Donetsk.

Career
Born in Zaporizhzhia, Drambayev began his career in the local Metalurh Zaporizhzhia academy, until his transfer to the Shakhtar Donetsk academy in 2018.

He played in the Ukrainian Premier League Reserves and never made his debut for the senior Shakhtar Donetsk squad. In January 2021 Drambayev signed a half-year loan contract with Ukrainian Premier League side Mariupol and made the debut for the team as a second half-time substitution player in a losing home match against Oleksandriya on 14 February 2021.

For the 2022–23 season, Drambayev was loaned to Zulte Waregem in Belgium.

References

External links
 
 

2001 births
Living people
Footballers from Zaporizhzhia
Ukrainian footballers
Association football defenders
Ukraine youth international footballers
Ukraine under-21 international footballers
FC Shakhtar Donetsk players
FC Mariupol players
S.V. Zulte Waregem players
Ukrainian Premier League players
Belgian Pro League players
Ukrainian expatriate footballers
Expatriate footballers in Belgium
Ukrainian expatriate sportspeople in Belgium
21st-century Ukrainian people